Saudi Research and Media Group (SRMG) (also known as the Saudi Media Group) is a Saudi joint stock company registered in Riyadh. The group mainly publishes, prints and distributes various publications. The company operates in Saudi Arabia where there are no independent media.

The company has close ties to the Mohammed bin Salman government in Saudi Arabia. Its closeness to the government of Saudi Arabia has led it to be considered an outlet for the government in the west, particularly in the United Kingdom.

In April 2022, SRMG announced its new headquarters in Riyadh's King Abdullah Financial District (KAFD). The new headquarters commemorates the beginning of SRMG's global expansion and will house the offices of Asharq network which includes “Asharq News” and “Asharq Business with Bloomberg”.

History
The establishment of the SRMG dates back to 1963 when the first company of the group, Al Madina Printing and Publication Company, was founded. Al Madina Printing and Publication Company, was later called Saudi Printing and Packaging Company (SPPC) which was formally established in 1972  Hisham & Mohammed Ali Hafiz were one of the founders of the company. Kamal Adham, former head of Saudi intelligence, was also one of the early shareholders of the company.

Next, the company was established in London in 1978 with the launch of Asharq Al Awsat. Ten years later, on 5 July 1988, it was registered as a limited liability company in Riyadh and then, converted into a joint stock company in 2000.

The company was listed in the Saudi stock market, Tadawul, on 8 April 2006 and therefore, went public. In August 2008, an independent board of trustees of the company was formed, making it the first Arab media company with such a body.

Major shareholders
The company has been often related with the Saudi King Salman bin Abdulaziz. However, he is neither the chairman nor the shareholder of the company.
 
Major shareholders of the SRMG are as follows:
 Al Ahli Capital Fund 13    29.90%
 Al Ahli Capital Fund 4     29.90%

From 1989 to his death in 2002, Ahmed bin Salman was the chairman of the company. Then, his younger brother Faisal bin Salman became the chairman of the company. On 9 February 2013, Turki bin Salman succeeded Prince Faisal as chairman of the SRMG when the latter was appointed governor of the Madinah province. Prince Turki's term as chairman ended in April 2014 when he resigned from the post.

On 13 December 2015 the board of directors appointed Badr bin Abdullah Al Saud as the chairman and an independent member of the board.  Al Saud resigned from his position in 2018, with Dr Ghassan bin Abdulrahman Al-Shibil succeeding him as chairman in June 2018. After a three-year tenure, the current chairman Abdulrahman Ibrahim Alrowaita was appointed by the group in May 2021.

Business fields
SRMG is the largest publishing company in the Middle East engaged mainly in providing information products and services by publishing newspapers and magazines across the Middle East and globally. The company owns more than 30 daily, weekly and monthly newspapers and magazines, including Asharq Al Awsat, Arab News, Al Majalla, Urdu News, Arrajol and Al Eqtisadiah.

In 2021, SRMG titles were reported to have a combined monthly reach of 165 million. In July 2021, the company changed its business model with five divisions: media, international, events, research and polling, and innovation. Additionally, the company also deals with marketing, advertising and distributing services heavily across the MENA region and Europe. SRMG operates in 18 locations internationally.

Brands/ Media Platforms

Subsidiaries, associates and joint ventures
Major subsidiaries, associates and joint ventures of SRMG are given as follows:

References

1988 establishments in Saudi Arabia
Companies based in Riyadh
Companies listed on Tadawul
Companies of Saudi Arabia
Magazine publishing companies
Mass media companies established in 1988
Mass media in Riyadh
Newspaper companies
Saudi Arabian companies established in 1988